Mark Edmondson and Sherwood Stewart were the defending champions but lost in the final 6–4, 6–4 to Anders Järryd and Hans Simonsson.

Seeds

  Mark Edmondson /  Sherwood Stewart (final)
  Pat Cash /  Paul McNamee (quarterfinals)
  Peter Fleming /  Ferdi Taygan (quarterfinals)
  Anders Järryd /  Hans Simonsson (champions)

Draw

External links
1984 Custom Credit Australian Indoor Championships Doubles Draw

Doubles